The Ringmaster is a 2019 American documentary film starring Zachary Capp and Larry Lang. The documentary was directed by Molly Dworsky and Dave Newberg and is a Capp Bros Production in association with Asteroid and Space Metals Recovery.

The film premiered at the 2019 Festival of Cinema NYC and is scheduled to release digitally and on demand on October 6, 2020 through 1091 Pictures.

Plot 
An aging chef from Minnesota has his life turned upside down when a relentless filmmaker from Las Vegas tries to make the chef's onion rings world famous.

Featured people

Reception 
The film premiered at the Festival of Cinema NYC in August 2019 and took home the Best Feature Documentary prize. It then went on to win the Best Screenwriting Award at Doc LA - Los Angeles Documentary Film Festival and concluded its festival run at the DOC EDGE Festival in New Zealand.

References

External links 
 
 

American documentary films
2019 films
2019 documentary films
1091 Pictures films
2010s English-language films
2010s American films